Huseyn Hummat oghlu Najafov (January 1, 1907 — July 16, 1967) was an Azerbaijani party and state figure, First Secretary of the Nakhchivan Regional Committee of the Communist Party of the Azerbaijan (1940–1948), Minister of Forestry and Wood Processing Industry of the Azerbaijan SSR.

Biography 
Huseyn Najafov was born in 1907 in Kolanly village of Erivan Uyezd. He moved to Ganja when he was 19 years old. Here he rose from a worker in a textile factory to the position of chairman of the factory committee.

From 1930 he worked as the secretary of Ganja city Komsomol Committee, the head of the cultural education department of the Central Committee of Azerbaijan Komsomol, the head of the political department in Nakhchivan MTS, the head of the personnel department of Baku city Party Committee. In 1939 he was elected the first secretary of the Youth Union of the Lenin Komsomol of Azerbaijan, in 1940-1948 he worked as the first secretary of the Nakhchivan Regional Committee of the Communist Party of the Azerbaijan. From 1948 he was the Minister of Forest Industry of the Azerbaijan SSR.

Huseyn Najafov graduated from the Higher Party School under the Central Committee of the CPSU in 1937. He was elected a deputy of the Supreme Soviet of the Soviet Union (2nd convocation) and the Supreme Soviet of the Azerbaijan SSR and the Supreme Soviet of the Nakhchivan Autonomous Soviet Socialist Republic (2nd convocation).

Huseyn Najafov died in Baku in 1967 and was buried in the Alley of Honor.

Awards 
 Order of Lenin — February 25, 1946
 Order of the Patriotic War (2nd degree) — February 1, 1945
 Order of the Red Banner of Labour — April 27, 1941
 Order of the Red Star — 1945
 Medal "For the Defence of the Caucasus" — 1944
 Medal "For Valiant Labour in the Great Patriotic War 1941–1945"

References

External links 
 

1907 births
1967 deaths
Azerbaijan Communist Party (1920) politicians
Communist Party of the Soviet Union members
Government ministers of Azerbaijan
Members of the Supreme Soviet of the Azerbaijan Soviet Socialist Republic
People's commissars and ministers of the Azerbaijan Soviet Socialist Republic
Second convocation members of the Supreme Soviet of the Soviet Union
Recipients of the Order of Lenin
Recipients of the Order of the Red Banner of Labour
Recipients of the Order of the Red Star
Burials at Alley of Honor